Pseudorationalism was the label given by economist and philosopher Otto Neurath to a school of thought that he was heavily critical of, which is the idea that all actions can be understood rationally. He made these criticisms throughout many of his writings, but primarily in his 1913 paper "The lost wanderers of Descartes and the auxiliary motive" and later to a lesser extent in his 1935 "Pseudorationalismus der Falsifikation". This was a review of, and attack on, Popper's first book, Logik der Forschung (The Logic of Scientific Discovery), contrasting this approach with his own view of what rationalism should properly be.  He argues that pseudorationalists make the mistake of assuming a complete picture of reality, an impossibility which leads them to further false assumptions. Neurath asserted that scientific endeavour was instead a continuing and never-ending series of choices, simply because of the ambiguity of language.

Neurath's argument
Neurath aimed his criticism at a Cartesian belief that all actions can be subject to rational analysis, saying that

Neurath considered that "pseudo-rationalists", be they philosophers or scientists, made the mistake of assuming that a complete rational system could be devised for the laws of nature.  He argued rather that no system could be complete, being based upon a picture of reality that could only ever be incomplete and imperfect.  Pseudo-rationalism, in Neurath's view, was a refusal or simple inability to face up to the limits of rationality and reason.  "Rationalism", he wrote , "sees its chief triumph in the clear recognition of the limits of actual insight.".  Whereas a pseudorationalist acknowledges no such limits, but rather contents that all decisions can be subject to the rules of insight.  Scientific method is, according to Neurath, pseudorationalist where it contends that the rules for the scientific method will always lead ever closer to the truth.

Neurath further challenged Cartesian "pseudorationalism" by asserting that operating upon incomplete data was in fact the norm, where Cartesian thinking would have it be the rare exception.  Rather than there being one, final, rational answer to any given problem, Neurath asserted that scientific endeavour required a continuing and never-ending series of choices, made so in part because of the ambiguity of language.

References

Further reading 
 

Metatheory of science
Rationalism